The Philosophy of the Teachings of Islam is an essay on Ahmadiyya Islam by Mirza Ghulam Ahmad, founder of the Ahmadiyya religious movement. The original was written in Urdu with the title Islami Usool ki Falāsifi, in order to be read at the Conference of Great Religions held at Lahore on December 26–29, 1896. It explicitly deals with the following five broad themes with detail set by the moderators of the Conference:

 the physical, moral, and spiritual states of man;
 what is the state of man after death?
 the object of man's life and the means of its attainment;
 the operation of the practical ordinances of the Law in this life and the next;
 sources of Divine knowledge

The subjects of the soul, the threefold reformation of man, what is moral quality? Why the flesh of swine is prohibited, the attributes of God and heaven upon earth are also discussed.

In 1896, during the Christmas Holidays a Hindu by the name of Swami Sadhu Shugan Chandra convened a conference of Great Religions at Lahore. A committee was appointed to oversee the arrangements. Six people were chosen as its moderators including the judge of the Chief Court of Punjab and the former governor of Jammu.

The committee invited the learned representatives of the Hindu, Christian and Muslim faiths to set forth the excellences of their respective faiths. The main objective of such a conference was so that the learned divines of each of these faiths were given the opportunity to convince others of the truth of their religion in the context of a few published themes and so that the listeners may assess each speech and accept the truth from wherever it was to be found. Each speaker was required to address the five themes set by the moderators and to confine his discourse to the holy scriptures of their religions. Among those who attended the conference were representatives of Hinduism, Freethought, the Theosophical Society, Christianity, Islam and Sikhism as well as various scholars, barristers, lawyers, professor, doctors and extra assistants, who numbered between 7 and 8 thousand.

The speech representing Islam was the essay written by Gulam Ahmad and though he could not attend himself due to poor health, it was read out by his disciple Mawlwi Abdul Karim. It could not be read out within the set time allotted for it; therefore the conference was extended to an extra day. The Report of the Conference of Great Religions stated:

The essay was delivered in four hours and from start to finish it was most interesting and well appreciated.

On 21 December 1896 Ghulam Ahmad declared that he had been informed by God that his essay would be the most overpowering one. He stated:

It was originally published in The report of the Conference of Great Religions and was later published in book form as Islami Usool Ki Falāsifi. It was subsequently translated into English. It has seen many editions and has been translated into French, Dutch, German, Spanish and various other languages.

See also

Writings of Mirza Ghulam Ahmad

References

Philosophy of the Teachings of Islam | Amazon.com

External links

 Philosophy of the Teachings of Islam
 A Collection of Books

Philosophy and Teachings of Islam, The
Works by Mirza Ghulam Ahmad
Islamic theology books
19th-century Indian books
Indian religious texts
19th-century philosophy